Nadeen El-Dawlatly (born 22 June 1993 in Doha, Qatar) is an Egyptian table tennis player. She plays for El-Ahly Club in Cairo. She qualified for the London 2012 Olympic Games with her result at the 2011 All-Africa Games.

Personal life
El-Dawlatly was born into a table tennis family. Both her parents and her siblings were successful table tennis players. She began playing aged 7 at the Ahly Club Table Tennis School under the supervision of her father.

Career record

African Junior Table Tennis Championships
 2010 Oyo: Girls Singles, Girls Doubles, Girls Team

African U21 Championships
 2011 Rabat: Girls Singles, Girls Doubles, Mixed Doubles

All Africa Games
 2011 Maputo: Women's Team
 2011 Maputo: Women's Singles, Doubles, Mixed Doubles

References

External links
 
 
 
 
 
 Fan Page on Facebook

1993 births
Living people
Egyptian female table tennis players
Table tennis players at the 2012 Summer Olympics
Table tennis players at the 2016 Summer Olympics
Olympic table tennis players of Egypt
African Games gold medalists for Egypt
African Games medalists in table tennis
African Games silver medalists for Egypt
African Games bronze medalists for Egypt
Competitors at the 2011 All-Africa Games
Competitors at the 2015 African Games
21st-century Egyptian women
20th-century Egyptian women